Best Wishes may refer to

 A greeting

Film and television
 Best Wishes for Tomorrow, a 2007 Japanese film by director Takashi Koizumi
 "Best Wishes", an episode of the American television program Ed
Pocket Monsters: Best Wishes!, the Japanese title of the animated TV series Pokémon the Series: Black & White
 "Best Wishes", a season 18 episode of Arthur

Music

Albums
Best Wishes (Cro-Mags album), 1989
Best Wishes: Live at the Labirinti Sonori Festival 2001, Steve Lacy, 2001
Best Wishes, Jad Fair, 1987

Songs
"Best Wishes" (Duke Ellington song), 1932

"Best Wishes", by Fairport Convention on Sense of Occasion,  2007
"Best Wishes", a single by Alternative TV, 1991
"Best Wishes", single by Ronnie Sundin and Daphne Walker, 1960